Israel sent a delegation to compete at the 2008 Summer Paralympics in Beijing. Israel sent 42 athletes, who competed in 11 sports: archery, athletics, basketball, cycling, equestrian, rowing, sailing, shooting, swimming, table tennis and tennis. The country's flagbearer during the Games' opening ceremony was Yizhar Cohen, who won three gold medals at the 1988 Seoul Paralympics.

Medalists

| width="78%" align="left" valign="top" |

| width="22%" align="left" valign="top" |

Archery

Israel's squad included 1 athlete.

Athletics

Israel's squad included 1 athlete.

Basketball

Men

Pool B

 Qualified for quarterfinals

Cycling

Israel's squad included 1 athlete.

Equestrian

Equestrian in the Paralympic Games is Dressage only.

Rowing

WB : World's best time
Q : qualified for final
R : qualified for repechage

Sailing

Note: The points are totaled from the best 9 results of the 11 races, with lower totals being better.

Shooting

Swimming

Key: WR=World record; PR=Paralympic record

Table tennis

Tennis

References

External links
Beijing 2008 Paralympic Games Official Site
International Paralympic Committee
Israeli Paralympic Committee

Nations at the 2008 Summer Paralympics
2008
Paralympics